Senator Willey may refer to:

Members of the United States Senate
Calvin Willey (1776–1858), U.S. Senator from Connecticut from 1825 to 1831
Waitman T. Willey (1811–1900), U.S. Senator from West Virginia from 1863 to 1871

United States state senate members
Edward E. Willey (1910–1986), Virginia State Senate
John W. Willey (1797–1841), Ohio State Senate

See also
Senator Wiley (disambiguation)